Grammodes ocellata, the large-eyed box-owlet, is a moth of the family Noctuidae first described by J. G. O. Tepper in 1890. It is found in the northern half of Australia.

The wingspan is about 40 mm.

The larvae feed on Phyllanthus maderaspatanus.

References

Ophiusina
Moths described in 1890